The Battle of Tettenhall (sometimes called the Battle of Wednesfield or Wōdnesfeld) took place, according to the Anglo-Saxon Chronicle, near Tettenhall on 5 August 910. The allied forces of Mercia and Wessex met an army of Northumbrian Vikings in Mercia.

Background
After successful raids by Danish Vikings, significant parts of northeastern England, formerly Northumbria, were under their control. Danish attacks into central England had been resisted and effectively reduced by Alfred the Great, to the point where his son, King Edward of Wessex, could launch offensive attacks against the foreigners. Edward was allied with the Mercians under his sister Æthelflæd, and their combined forces were formidable. The allies launched a five-week campaign against Lindsey in 909, and successfully captured the relics of Saint Oswald of Northumbria.

The Battle
The Vikings quickly sought retaliation for the Northern excursion. In 910, the Danelaw kings assembled a fleet and transported a Danish army, via the River Severn, directly into the heart of Mercia, embarking at a point believed to be south of Bridgnorth, Shropshire. There they ravaged the land and collected large amounts of valuable plunder, but quickly sought to return north rather than be trapped in hostile territory. However an army of West Saxons and Mercians caught them at Wednesfield, near Tettenhall, and according to the Anglo-Saxon Chronicle defeated them and inflicted losses of many thousands including two or three kings.

While little is known of the exact manoeuvres employed at the battle, it is obvious the allies trapped their Viking opponents, preventing them from returning to their Severn moorings, and inflicted heavy casualties on them. The Anglo-Saxon Chronicle states that "many thousands of men" were killed, referring to the Danes. Seemingly unable to retreat, the kings leading the Viking raid, Eowils and Halfdan and Ingwær, were killed by the allied troops.

Aftermath
With the Northern Danes subdued, the forces of Wessex and Mercia could be focused against the Vikings who had settled further south, and there was no further incursion from the north for a generation.

References

External links
Anglo-Saxon Monarchs - Edward the Elder
Anglo-Saxons Online
Sean Miller, "Edward the Elder", Oxford Dictionary of National Biography

Tettenhall 910
Tettenhall 910
Military history of Staffordshire
910s conflicts
910
10th century in England